Bircii may refer to several places in Romania:

Bircii, a village in Bengești-Ciocadia Commune, Gorj County
Bircii, a village in Scorniceşti Town, Olt County